Oru Kadhalan Oru Kadhali is a bilingual drama film, written and directed by Selvendran and produced by Sai Rathnam in Tamil and Telugu. The film stars Sarath Chander, Rambha and Lakshmi Rai. Music for the film was composed by Bharani and while the Telugu version, Neeku Naaku released in October 2006, the Tamil film opened to mixed reviews in September 2009.

Cast

Sarath Chander as Charan
Rambha as Lakshmi
Lakshmi Rai as Saranya
Abhinayashree as Lakshmi
R. Sundarrajan
Manobala / Giri Babu as Ramaiah
Thalaivasal Vijay
Ponnambalam as Lingesu
Vennira Aadai Moorthy / Brahmanandam as the college professor
Anu Mohan
Telangana Shakuntala
Sankarabharanam Rajalakshmi
Keerthana
Bakya
Kavitha
Rajashree as Sumathi
Anupama
Kadhal Sukumar
Suman Setty
Babloo

Production
The director of the film, Selvendran, who had previously worked with director Shankar, made his directorial debut with the project. The film marked a comeback for actress Rambha after a period away from Tamil films, and she signed on to star in the film in early 2005. The film was made simultaneously in Telugu and Tamil, with few changes in the cast between the versions.

Release
The Telugu version of the film, Neeku Naaku released in October 2006 to mixed reviews. Despite beginning production as a medium budget venture, delays meant that the Tamil version of the film had a low key release in September 2009. It released alongside five other Tamil films and went unnoticed at the box office. The film was later dubbed and released in Hindi as Ek Haseen - The Dirty Girl.

Soundtrack
The film's soundtrack was composed by Bharani, with lyrics written by Kabilan.

 Galagalagalappa - Mahathi, Tippu
 Maama Maama - Ranjith, Gayatri
 Yei Thagathaga - Suchitra
 Thiruttu Payalae - Saindhavi
 Muddulagumma Maddulagumma - Reshmi

References

2009 films
2000s Tamil-language films
2009 directorial debut films